Beaverhill and Beaver Hills may refer to:

A beaver lodge
Beaver Hill, Oregon, an unincorporated community in Coos County
Beaverhill Lake, a lake in central Alberta
Beaver Hills (Alberta), a rolling upland region
Beaver Hills (Saskatchewan), a range of hills
Beaver Hills (New Haven), a neighborhood in the city of New Haven, Connecticut
Beaverhill Lake Group, a geological region of Canada